Liutgard of Saxony (c. 845 – 17 November 885) was Queen of East Francia (see list of Frankish queens and also list of German queens) from 876 until 882 by her marriage with King Louis the Younger.

Biography
She was born between 840 and 850, the daughter of the Saxon count Liudolf (805/20–866), a progenitor of the Ottonian dynasty (Liudolfings), and his wife Oda of Billung (805/06–913).

Liutgard was especially noted for her strong will and political ambition, a reliable supporter of her husband. She is seen as a driving force behind King Louis' struggle with the West Frankish king Charles the Bald around the possession of Lotharingia, culminating in the 876 Battle of Andernach and ending in the final acquisition of the Lotharingian realm by the 880 Treaty of Ribemont.

Marriages and issue
Before 29 November 874, Liutgard married the Carolingian ruler Louis the Younger (830/835–882), second son of King Louis the German, at Aschaffenburg, Franconia. They had two children:
 Louis (877–879), reportedly died after a fall from a window of the Imperial palace in Frankfurt.
 Hildegard (c. 879 – after 899), became a nun in Frauenchiemsee Abbey, Bavaria.

After Louis' death, she married  in 882 the Hunfriding duke Burchard I of Swabia (855/60–911). They had three children:
 Burchard II (883/84–926), Duke of Swabia from 917. 
 Udalrich (884/85–885).
 Dietpirch of Swabia (also known as Theoberga), married the Swabian count Hupald of Dillingen (d. 909), mother of Bishop Ulrich of Augsburg.

References

Sources

|-

840s births
885 deaths
Carolingian dynasty
German queens consort
Frankish queens consort
Duchesses of Swabia
Brunonids
Hunfridings
9th-century people from East Francia
9th-century Saxon people
Saxon women
Women from the Carolingian Empire
Remarried royal consorts
Daughters of monarchs